Stipagrostis sabulicola, the Namib dune bushman grass, is a species of grass endemic to the dunes of the Namib desert. The perennial grass grows up to 200cm tall and has a wide system of shallow roots, allowing it to catch water in the form of fog and dew, additional to rain.

References

Aristidoideae
Flora of Namibia